IDEX Biometrics ASA, (NASDAQ: IDBA) is a Norwegian biometrics company, specialising in fingerprint imaging and fingerprint recognition technology. The company was founded 1996 and is headquartered in Oslo, but its main operation is in the US, with offices in New York and Massachusetts. The company also has offices in the UK and China.

IDEX offers fingerprint sensor and biometric software for identity cards, banking cards, smart cards, access control, healthcare, IOT and other security solutions. Fingerprint recognition is one form of biometric identification, other examples being DNA, face recognition, iris recognition and retinal scan as well as identification based on behavioral patterns such as speaker recognition, keystroke dynamics and signature recognition.

Technology
IDEX's SmartFinger Film sensor technology is based on polymer process technologies and offers small, ultra-thin and flexible swipe fingerprint sensors.

IDEX holds early patents for low-cost capacitive fingerprint sensors and has a cross-licence with Apple relating to this technology.

IDEX has demonstrated mobile phone-related technology implementations running on an Android platform as well as a technology concept for finger print sensors built into the cover glass of mobile phones. Finger recognition solutions for Apple iPhone and iPad using SmartFinger have been launched.

IDEX's technology has also been integrated in biometric ISO-compliant cards. Fingerprint-based authentication of payment cards has gradually become the main focus of the company's efforts to commercialize its technology.

In March 2021, the company started shipping TrustedBio, a new generation of sensors specifically targeting the card market.

Global Partners

IDEX has announced partnerships with global companies including Mastercard, IDEMIA, 
Chutian Dragon,
Feitian, Goldpac, HED, 
Hengbao, Excelsecu, Infineon and XH Smart Tech.

References

External links
 

Biometrics
Biometrics software
Access control software
Authentication methods
Identification
Companies based in Oslo
Norwegian companies established in 1996
Companies listed on the Oslo Stock Exchange
Companies listed on the Nasdaq
Technology companies of Norway